Mohamed Lamine Keita (born March 20, 2003) is a Guinean-Burkinabé college basketball player who plays for St. John's. He previously played professionally with SLAC in the Basketball Africa League (BAL).

Early career
Born in Conakry, Keita played for the NBA Academy Africa in Senegal in his younger years. He also played for The Winchendon School in Massachusetts.

College career
On May 8, 2022, Keita committed to play collegiately for St. John's, who scouted him during a during a live recruiting spring period with his Amateur Athletic Union (AAU) team, the New York Jayhawks.

Professional career
Keita joined the Guinean club SLAC for the Basketball Africa League's 2022 season. On March 7, 2022, Keita recorded his first BAL double-double with 10 points and 12 rebounds in a regular season loss against AS Salé.

National team career
Keita represented the Guinean under-18 national team at the 2018 FIBA U18 African Championship in Egypt.

BAL career statistics

|-
|style="text-align:left;"|2022
|style="text-align:left;"|SLAC
| 6 || 1 || 16.3 || style="background:#cfecec;"|.750* || – || .250 || 5.0 || 0.2 || 0.2 || 1.4 || 6.4
|-
| colspan=2 align=center | Career || 6 || 1 || 16.3 || .750 || – || .250 || 5.0 || 0.2 || 0.2 || 1.4 || 6.4
|}

References

Living people
2003 births
Forwards (basketball)
Guinean men's basketball players
Burkinabé men's basketball players
SLAC basketball players
Sportspeople from Conakry